Series 2 of Project Catwalk premiered on 8 January 2007 on Sky One.  It was presented by Kelly Osbourne.

Series 2 Challenges

 Green background and WINNER means the overall winner.
 Blue background and WIN means the designer won that challenge.
 Red background and OUT means the designer lost and was out of the competition.
 Light blue background and HIGH means the designer had one of the highest scores for that challenge.
 Pink background and LOW means the designer had one of the lowest scores for that challenge.
 Orange background and LOW means the designer had the second lowest score for that challenge.

Contestants
The twelve contestants are:
Christine Newman, 21
Fatz Kassim, 31
Giles Pearson, 28
Grant Lilley, 23
Henry James Blogg, 22
Luisa Fici, 22
Luke Youngblood, 20
Monika Patrycja Rene, 28
Shawla Ahad, 31
Tyla Schneider, 25
Tymoor Gharbo, 22
Wayne Aveline, 33

Fashion models
Betsie Dsane
Dasha Zeromska
Erica Harrison
Gabriella Riggon
Khiara Parker
Liana Goss
Mary (Voluntarily left, ep.2)
Nicola Vernon
Rachel Ritfeld
Ruth Waterfall-Brown
Sally Kettle (Eliminated, ep.2 but then replaced Mary)
Simona Ehmann-Swims

External links 

2007 British television seasons
Season 03
2008 in fashion